This is a list of Russian football transfers in the 2022–23 winter transfer window by club. Only clubs of the 2022–23 Russian Premier League are included.

Russian Premier League 2022–23

Akhmat Grozny

In:

Out:

CSKA Moscow

In:

Out:

Dynamo Moscow

In:

Out:

Fakel Voronezh

In:

Out:

Khimki

In:

Out:

Krasnodar

In:

Out:

Krylia Sovetov Samara

In:

Out:

Lokomotiv Moscow

In:

Out:

Orenburg

In:

Out:

Pari Nizhny Novgorod

In:

Out:

Rostov

In:

Out:

Sochi

In:

Out:

Spartak Moscow

In:

Out:

Torpedo Moscow

In:

Out:

Ural Yekaterinburg

In:

Out:

Zenit Saint Petersburg

In:

Out:

References

Transfers
2022-23
Russia